Export of the revolution is actions by a victorious revolutionary government of one country to promote similar revolutions in unruled areas or other countries as a manifestation of revolutionary internationalism of certain kind, such as the Marxist proletarian internationalism.

Fred Halliday analyzes the traits of the export of revolution by case studies of the French Revolution, the Russian Revolution, and the Iranian Revolution.

See also
 Cultural Revolution#Foreign_relations
 Domino theory
 Empire of Liberty
 French Revolution
Sister republic
 Interventionism
 Iranian Revolution
 Regime change
 Revolutionary wave
 Russian Revolution
 Workers of the world, unite!
 World revolution

References

Foreign intervention
Revolution terminology
Political theories